The Svobodny Railroad Car Repair Plant or Svobodnensky car-repair plant is an enterprise for the repair of railroad cars. It is located in Svobodny, Amur region, Russia.

The plant is part of the Transvagonmash company.

History
The plant was founded in 1933 under the name Mikhaylo-Chesnokovsky car-repair plant. Since 1968, it has been called Svobodnensky car-repair plant.

During the Great Patriotic War the company built flamethrowers.

The plant now repairs gondola cars and makes railroad wheels.

References 

Companies based in Amur Oblast
Manufacturing companies of Russia
Mechanical engineering companies of Russia
Manufacturing companies established in 1933
1933 establishments in the Soviet Union
Manufacturing companies of the Soviet Union